This is a list of Brazilian television related events from 1994.

Events
17 July - Brazil beat Italy 3-2 on penalties to win the 1994 World Cup at Pasadena, California in the United States.

Debuts
9 May - Castelo Rá-Tim-Bum (1994-1997)

Television shows

1970s
Turma da Mônica (1976–present)

Births

Deaths

See also
1994 in Brazil